True Leaf Market is an organic seed and horticultural company based in Salt Lake City, Utah, United States. It markets under various brands, the largest of which is Mountain Valley Seed Company. As one of the major seed suppliers in Utah, True Leaf Market specializes in supplying non-GMO seeds, microgreen supplies, and wheatgrass supplies.

History
True Leaf Market was founded as Mountain Valley Seed Company in Logan, Utah in 1974 by Demetrios Agathangelides, a Greek-American plant geneticist at Utah State University who was doing research on plant varieties adapted to environments with high altitudes and short growing seasons. The company has since grown and merged with other companies, and has been renamed as True Leaf Market. As of 2014, True Leaf Market is owned and managed by Robb Baumann, Lance Heaton, Kaitlin Jones, and Parker Garlitz. Today, True Leaf Market remains as one of the few hundred independently owned seed companies in the United States, due to mass consolidation of seed companies by giant agribusinesses taking place over the decades.

Brands
True Leaf Market brands include the following.
Mountain Valley Seed Company
Handy Pantry Sprouting (sprouting supplies)
Wheatgrass Kits (wheatgrass supplies)
Bloom Master (hanging baskets and other growing supplies)
Stack and Grow
Living Whole Foods
Trellis + Co. (fermenting supplies)

Products
True Leaf Market products include:
Non-GMO seeds (for planting flowers, vegetables, herbs, cover crops, etc.)
Sprouting seeds for growing microgreens and other vegetables and plants
Kits for microgreens (vegetable green, harvested after sprouting as shoots)
Wheatgrass seeds, kits, juicers, and supplies
Gardening supplies: fertilizers, composting supplies, greenhouses, growing equipment, etc.
Mason jar accessories, including fermenting kits, canning supplies, and sprouting lids

The company also sells its products with major retailers and wholesalers, including Costco.

Community engagement
One of True Leaf Market's brands, Mountain Valley Seed Company, hosts the annual Ginormous Pumpkin Regatta at Oquirrh Lake in South Jordan, Utah every October.

True Leaf Market also offers scholarships opportunities for students.

References

External links

Agriculture companies established in 1974
Agriculture companies of the United States
Horticultural companies of the United States
Seed companies
Companies based in Salt Lake City
1974 establishments in Utah